Insilico Medicine is a biotechnology company based in Pak Shek Kok, Hong Kong in Hong Kong Science Park near the Chinese University of Hong Kong and in New York, at The Cure by Deerfield. The company combines genomics, big data analysis, and deep learning for in silico drug discovery.

History 
CEO Alex Zhavoronkov founded Insilico Medicine in 2014, as an alternative to animal testing for research and development programs in the pharmaceutical industry. By using artificial intelligence and deep-learning techniques, Insilico is able to analyze how a compound will affect cells and what drugs can be used to treat the cells in addition to possible side effects. Through its Pharma.AI division, the company provides machine learning services to different pharmaceutical, biotechnology, and skin care companies. Insilico is known for hiring mainly through hackathons such as their own MolHack online hackathon.

The company has multiple collaborations in the applications of next-generation artificial intelligence technologies such as the generative adversarial networks (GANs) and reinforcement learning to the generation of novel molecular structures with desired properties. In conjunction with Alan Aspuru-Guzik's group at Harvard, they have published a journal article about an improved  architecture for molecular generation which combines GANs, reinforcement learning, and a differentiable neural computer.

In 2017, Insilico was named one of the Top five AI companies by NVIDIA for its potential for social impact. Insilico has  resources in Belgium, Russia, and the UK and hires talent through hackathons and other local competitions. In 2017, Insilico had raised $8.26 million in funding from investors including Deep Knowledge Ventures, JHU A-Level Capital, Jim Mellon, and Juvenescence. In 2019 it raised another $37 million from Fidelity Investments, Eight Roads Ventures, Qiming Venture Partners, WuXi AppTec, Baidu, Sinovation, Lilly Asia Ventures, Pavilion Capital, BOLD Capital, and other investors. In 2021 after developing a novel preclinical candidate molecule for a novel target, the company announced a series C $255 million megaround   from Warburg Pincus, Sequoia Capital, Orbimed, Mirae Asset Financial Group, and over 25 biotechnology, AI, and pharmaceutical investors

Research
In 2019, the company in partnership with researchers at the University of Toronto, used AI to design potential new drugs. One has shown promising initial results when tested in mice. To demonstrate the capacity of their proprietary AI platforms, the company has published two projects on identifying therapeutic targets for ageing and amyotrophic lateral sclerosis in 29 March and 28 June 2022, respectively. By collaborating with scientists in the University of Chicago, George Mason University, and University of Liverpool, their work on ageing demonstrated that there might be several alternative senolytic targets and pathways that can be targeted with small molecules drugs. They yield a list of dual-purpose targets implicated in ageing and age-associated diseases. Age-associated diseases can be impacted and ageing can be retarded, which also contribute to the extension of life expectancy. For ALS, the company worked with researchers from Answer ALS, Johns Hopkins University School of Medicine, Harvard Medical School, Mayo Clinic, Tsinghua University, and 4B Technologies Limited. This study yielded a list of 28 therapeutic targets, with validations in the ALS-mimicked Drosophila model, which provides hope for the development of new therapeutic regimens for this deadly disease.

References 

Biotechnology companies of Hong Kong
Drug discovery companies
Biogerontology organizations
Life extension organizations
Organizations established in 2014